In mathematics, and specifically in number theory, a divisor function is an arithmetic function related to the divisors of an integer. When referred to as the divisor function, it counts the number of divisors of an integer (including 1 and the number itself). It appears in a number of remarkable identities, including relationships on the Riemann zeta function and the Eisenstein series of modular forms. Divisor functions were studied by Ramanujan, who gave a number of important congruences and identities; these are treated separately in the article Ramanujan's sum.

A related function is the divisor summatory function, which, as the name implies, is a sum over the divisor function.

Definition
The sum of positive divisors function σz(n), for a real or complex number z, is defined as the sum of the zth powers of the positive divisors of n.  It can be expressed in sigma notation as

where  is shorthand for "d divides n".
The notations d(n), ν(n) and τ(n) (for the German Teiler = divisors) are also used to denote σ0(n), or the number-of-divisors function. When z is 1, the function is called the sigma function or sum-of-divisors function, and the subscript is often omitted, so σ(n) is the same as σ1(n).

The aliquot sum s(n) of n is the sum of the proper divisors (that is, the divisors excluding n itself), and equals σ1(n) − n; the aliquot sequence of n is formed by repeatedly applying the aliquot sum function.

Example
For example, σ0(12) is the number of the divisors of 12:

 

while σ1(12) is the sum of all the divisors:

 

and the aliquot sum s(12) of proper divisors is:

 

σ-1(n) is sometimes called the abundancy index of n, and we have:

Table of values
The cases x = 2 to 5 are listed in  − , x = 6 to 24 are listed in  − .

Properties

Formulas at prime powers

For a prime number p,

because by definition, the factors of a prime number are 1 and itself. Also, where pn# denotes the primorial,

since n prime factors allow a sequence of binary selection ( or 1) from n terms for each proper divisor formed. However, these are not in general the smallest numbers whose number of divisors is a power of two; instead, the smallest such number may be obtained by multiplying together the first n Fermi–Dirac primes, prime powers whose exponent is a power of two.

The divisor function is multiplicative (since each divisor c of the product mn with  distinctively correspond to a divisor a of m and a divisor b of n), but not completely multiplicative:

The consequence of this is that, if we write

where r = ω(n) is the number of distinct prime factors of n, pi is the ith prime factor, and ai is the maximum power of pi by which n is divisible, then we have: 

which, when x ≠ 0, is equivalent to the useful formula: 

When x = 0, d(n) is: 

For example, if n is 24, there are two prime factors (p1 is 2; p2 is 3); noting that 24 is the product of 23×31, a1 is 3 and a2 is 1. Thus we can calculate  as so:

 

The eight divisors counted by this formula are 1, 2, 4, 8, 3, 6, 12, and 24.

Other properties and identities
Euler proved the remarkable recurrence:

Indeed, Euler proved this by logarithmic differentiation of the identity in his Pentagonal number theorem.

Similarly, the number  is odd if and only if n is a square or twice a square.

We also note s(n) = σ(n) − n. Here s(n) denotes the sum of the proper divisors of n, that is, the divisors of n excluding n itself. This function is used to recognize perfect numbers, which are the n such that s(n) = n. If s(n) > n, then n is an abundant number, and if s(n) < n, then n is a deficient number.

As an example, for two primes , let

.

Then

and

where  is Euler's totient function.

Then, the roots of

In 1984, Roger Heath-Brown proved that the equality

Series relations
Two Dirichlet series involving the divisor function are: 

where  is the Riemann zeta function. The series for d(n) = σ0(n) gives: 

 

and a Ramanujan identity

which is a special case of the Rankin–Selberg convolution.

A Lambert series involving the divisor function is: 

for arbitrary complex |q| ≤ 1 and a.  This summation also appears as the Fourier series of the Eisenstein series and the invariants of the Weierstrass elliptic functions.

For , there is an explicit series representation with Ramanujan sums  as :

The computation of the first terms of  shows its oscillations around the "average value" :

Growth rate
In little-o notation, the divisor function satisfies the inequality:

More precisely, Severin Wigert showed that:

On the other hand, since there are infinitely many prime numbers,

In Big-O notation, Peter Gustav Lejeune Dirichlet showed that the average order of the divisor function satisfies the following inequality:

where  is Euler's gamma constant. Improving the bound  in this formula is known as Dirichlet's divisor problem.

The behaviour of the sigma function is irregular. The asymptotic growth rate of the sigma function can be expressed by: 

where lim sup is the limit superior.  This result is Grönwall's theorem, published in 1913 . His proof uses Mertens' 3rd theorem, which says that:

where p denotes a prime.

In 1915, Ramanujan proved that under the assumption of the Riemann hypothesis, Robin's inequality
 (where γ is the Euler–Mascheroni constant)
holds for all sufficiently large n .  The largest known value that violates the inequality is n=5040. In 1984, Guy Robin proved that the inequality is true for all n > 5040 if and only if the Riemann hypothesis is true .  This is Robin's theorem and the inequality became known after him.  Robin furthermore showed that if the Riemann hypothesis is false then there are an infinite number of values of n that violate the inequality, and it is known that the smallest such n > 5040 must be superabundant . It has been shown that the inequality holds for large odd and square-free integers, and that the Riemann hypothesis is equivalent to the inequality just for n divisible by the fifth power of a prime .

Robin also proved, unconditionally, that the inequality:

holds for all n ≥ 3.

A related bound was given by Jeffrey Lagarias in 2002, who proved that the Riemann hypothesis is equivalent to the statement that:

for every natural number n > 1, where  is the nth harmonic number, .

See also 
 Divisor sum convolutions, lists a few identities involving the divisor functions
 Euler's totient function, Euler's phi function
 Refactorable number
 Table of divisors
 Unitary divisor

Notes

References 
.

 Bach, Eric; Shallit, Jeffrey, Algorithmic Number Theory, volume 1, 1996, MIT Press.  , see page 234 in section 8.8.

External links
 
 
 Elementary Evaluation of Certain Convolution Sums Involving Divisor Functions PDF of a paper by Huard, Ou, Spearman, and Williams. Contains elementary (i.e. not relying on the theory of modular forms) proofs of divisor sum convolutions, formulas for the number of ways of representing a number as a sum of triangular numbers, and related results.

 
Analytic number theory
Number theory
Zeta and L-functions